The southern mud oyster, Australian flat oyster, native flat oyster, native mud oyster, or angasi oyster (Ostrea angasi), is endemic to southern Australia, ranging from Western Australia to southeast New South Wales and around Tasmania. Ostrea angasi superficially resembles Ostrea edulis and both species may be referred to with the name "flat oyster". However, the two species do not occur naturally in the same geographic distribution.

Habitat
This species is found in sheltered, silty or sand-bottomed estuaries at depths between 1 and 30 metres.

Diet
Flat oysters, like all other oyster species, are filter feeders, feeding on, and taking in anything small enough to be filtered in their gills. This may include plankton, microalgae or inorganic material.

Predators 
Oyster growers at Coffin Bay, South Australia have observed stingrays eating their experimental commercial stocks of Ostrea angasi.

Commercial harvesting
Extensive oyster reefs in southern Australia were largely destroyed by over-exploitation during the 19th and early 20th Centuries. Oysters were dredged directly from the seabed.

In the 21st century, commercial oyster growers in southern Australia have started experimentally farming O. angasi as a means to diversify their businesses. This was prompted by other growers suffering massive stock losses of Crassostrea gigas resulting from outbreaks of Pacific Oyster Mortality Syndrome (POMS).

Not-for-profit projects 
The not-for-profit organisation Estuary Care Foundation was established in South Australia to undertake trials growing Ostrea angasi in the Port River and adjacent waters. The organisation is also involved in seagrass monitoring and restoration work within the Port River.

Windara Reef 
Windara Reef was constructed in Gulf St Vincent, offshore from Ardrossan, to promote the reestablishment of Ostrea angasi. The reef was also opened to recreational fishers in 2017. As of April 2019, it was the largest shellfish reef restoration project in the southern hemisphere. The Nature Conservancy, the Australian Government, the South Australian Government, the Yorke Peninsula Council, The University of Adelaide and the Ian Potter Foundation have each contributed to funding the project.

References

Further reading

 Australian Government Species Bank info page (Archived version)

Ostrea
Commercial molluscs
Australian cuisine
Molluscs described in 1871